Oge Okoye  ( born 16 November 1980) is a Nigerian actress from Nnewi in Anambra State. Oge Okoye was born in London, and later moved to live in Lagos with her family. She completed her primary school in London before moving to Nigeria. Upon returning to Nigeria, she attended the University Primary School Enugu and moved on to the Holy Rosary College, Enugu for her secondary school.

Oge Okoye graduated from the Nnamdi Azikiwe University, Awka with a degree in theatre arts. Okoye joined the Nigerian film industry known as Nollywood in 2001. She came to limelight in 2002 after performing in the film ‘Spanner’ where she starred with Chinedu Ikedieze popularly known as ‘Aki’ in the Nigerian film industry. She married her longtime boyfriend Stanley Duru in 2005 and had two kids. She separated from her husband in 2012. In 2006, she was nominated for the African Movie Academy Award for "Best Actress in a supporting role" for her performance in the movie "Eagle's Bride"

Filmography 

 Endika Torices (2002)
 Blood Sister (2003)
 Forever Yours (2003)
 Handsome (2003)
 Magic Love (2003)
 My Command (2003)
 Sister Mary (2003)
 Arsenal (2004)
 Beautiful Faces (2004)
 I Believe in You (2004)
 Indecent Girl (2004) .... O'rel
 I Want Your Wife (2004)
 Little Angel (2004)
 My Desire (2004)
 Separate Lives (2004)
 Spanner 3 (2004)
 Spanner Goes to Jail (2004)
 11:45... Too Late (2005)
 Beyond Passion (2005)
 Black Bra (2005)

 Crazy Passion (2005)
 Desperate Love (2005)
 Eagle's Bride (2005)
 Emotional Battle (2005)
 Every Single Day (2005)
 Face of Africa (2005) .... Ukheria
 Friends & Lovers (2005)
 The Girl Is Mine (2005)
 It's Juliet or No One (2005)
 The King's Son (2005)
 Marry Me (2005)
 Orange Groove (2005)
 Paradise to Hell (2005)
 Shock (2005)
 To Love and Live Again (2005)
 Trinity (2005)
 Trouble Maker (2005)
 War Game (2006)
 The Snake Girl (2006)
 Blackberry Babes (2010)
 Sincerity 
 Sinful Game 
 Festac Town (2014)

Television series

See also
List of Nigerian actors

References

External links 

Living people
British emigrants to Nigeria
Igbo actresses
English film actresses
21st-century Nigerian actresses
Nnamdi Azikiwe University alumni
English people of Nigerian descent
English people of Igbo descent
Actresses from London
21st-century English women
21st-century English people
People from Anambra State
1980 births